The Tower is a 243-metre tower located on Sheikh Zayed Road, Dubai, UAE. It has 54 stories. This skyscraper with its remarkable pyramid peak was finished in 2002. It also bears a strong resemblance to the Nine Penn Center, located in Philadelphia, Pennsylvania and the nearby Al Yaqoub Tower. It also resembles Elizabeth Tower (Big Ben) in London.

See also
List of tallest buildings in Dubai
List of tallest buildings in the United Arab Emirates

External links
 emporis.com

Residential skyscrapers in Dubai
Buildings and structures completed in 2002
2002 establishments in the United Arab Emirates